The Avon Park Formation is a Middle Eocene geologic formation and is the oldest exposed sediments in Florida, United States.

Age
Period: Paleogene
Epoch: Middle Eocene~55.8 to 33.9 mya, calculates to a period of 
Faunal stage: Clarkforkian through early Chadronian

Location
The Avon Park formation is located on the crest of the Ocala Platform in Levy County with three distinct outcroppings. Citrus County has one outcropping near the county line with Levy County.

Composition
The Avon Park Formation consists of cream to light-brown or tan, poorly hardened to very hard, grainstone, packstone and wackestone, with rare mudstone. Fossils found throughout but not densely. These limestones are interbedded with vuggy dolomites which are soft to very hard and tan to brown, very fine to medium crystalline structure.

The Avon Park Formation, as with many formations, is part of the Floridan Aquifer system. Parts of the Avon Park Formation comprise important, subregional confining units within that system.

Fossils
The fossils are in molds and casts and include: 
Mollusks
Foraminifers
Echinoids
Algae
Carbonized plants

References

USGS Avon Park Formation
Florida Carbonate "Formations" and Conflicting Interpretations of Injection Well Regulations

Paleogene Florida
Geography of Citrus County, Florida
Geography of Levy County, Florida